Mick Keighery (17 June 1918 – 24 December 1968) was  a former Australian rules footballer who played with Fitzroy in the Victorian Football League (VFL).

Notes

External links 
		

1918 births
1968 deaths
Australian rules footballers from Victoria (Australia)
Fitzroy Football Club players
Leongatha Football Club players